The 1987 Associate Members' Cup Final, known as the Freight Rover Trophy for sponsorship reasons, was the 4th final of the domestic football cup competition for teams from the Third Division and Fourth Division. The final was played at Wembley Stadium, London on 24 May 1987, and was contested by Bristol City and Mansfield Town. With the score tied at 1–1 after extra time, Mansfield Town won the match in a penalty shootout.

The match was the first ever final at Wembley to be decided by a penalty shootout, and the trophy was Mansfield Town's first major honours in the club's history.

Match details

External links
Official website

Associate Members' Cup Final 1987
EFL Trophy Finals
Associate Members' Cup Final 1987
Associate Members' Cup Final 1987
Football League Trophy Final 1987